Burtolla (or Bartala) is a neighbourhood of North Kolkata in Kolkata district in the Indian state of West Bengal.

Etymology
It was named after the twin banyan (bar or bat in Bengali) that stood there. The Rajas of Sobhabazar had ordered severe punishment for those attempting to damage the trees, and even death for those trying to cut them down.

History
In 1888, one of the 25 newly organized police section houses was located in Burtolla. (For more information see Dihi Panchannagram.)

Geography

Police district
Burtolla police station is part of the North and North  Suburban Division of Kolkata Police. It is located at 1, Raja Rajkrishna Strret, Kolkata-700006. 

Amherst Street Women police station covers all police districts under the jurisdiction of the North and North Suburban division i.e. Amherst Street, Jorabagan, Shyampukur, Cossipore, Chitpur, Sinthi, Burtolla and Tala.

External links

References

Neighbourhoods in Kolkata